Nesophila is a genus of gastropods belonging to the family Endodontidae.

The species of this genus are found in Pacific Ocean.

Species:

Nesophila baldwini 
Nesophila capillata 
Nesophila distans 
Nesophila misoolensis 
Nesophila tiara 
Species brought into synonymy
 Nesophila demani (Tapparone Canefri, 1883): synonym of Lagivala demani (Tapparone-Canefri, 1883) (superseded combination)

References

 Bank, R. A. (2017). Classification of the Recent terrestrial Gastropoda of the World. Last update: July 16th, 2017

Gastropod genera
Endodontidae